Aurora Metro Center station is a Regional Transportation District (RTD) light rail station on the R Line in Aurora, Colorado. The station is located at Centrepoint Drive and Sable Boulevard and has a 145-stall park-and-ride lot. The station is between the Town Center at Aurora shopping center and the Aurora Municipal Center (city hall, police headquarters, central library, and history museum).

The station opened on February 24, 2017, along with the rest of the R Line. The former Centrepoint and Sable bus transfer center was renamed to Aurora Metro Center station when the light rail opened.

References

RTD light rail stations
Transportation buildings and structures in Aurora, Colorado
Railway stations in the United States opened in 2017
2017 establishments in Colorado